Fortsberg, a fortification overlooking Coral Bay in Saint John, U.S. Virgin Islands also known as Frederiksvaern, was built in 1760.  It was listed on the National Register of Historic Places in 1976.

The preceding fort on the site was seized by slaves in a November 23, 1733, rebellion. The slaves "massacred the garrison and occupied most of the plantations of St. John. The plantation owners fled to Mr. Durlo's plantation, now Caneel Bay, which was fortified and successfully defended. Two attempts by the Danes to  the rebellion were unsuccessful. Finally aid was secured from the Governor of Martinique. Four hundred French soldiers encamped near Fortsberg and the rebellion was suppressed after a campaign of six months."

The listing included two contributing structures and one contributing site.  The fort is a  structure with high walls and four bastions, built over ruins of an earlier one dating from 1723.  Ruins of an unidentified structure are nearby.

It has a  interior area. As of 1976, five historic cannons survived in the battery, although without their carriages.

The fort was occupied by British military in 1801 and during 1807 to 1815, during the Napoleonic Wars.

References

National Register of Historic Places in the United States Virgin Islands
Buildings and structures completed in 1760
Forts in the United States Virgin Islands